USS Sangamon was a  ironclad monitor constructed for the Union Navy during the second year of the American Civil War where she operated in the waterways of the Confederate States of America. She was later recommissioned and placed into service during the Spanish–American War.

Construction
The first U.S. Navy ship to be so named, Sangamon was built by the shipbuilding firm Reaney, Son & Archbold under the name Conestoga in the summer of 1862; renamed Sangamon on September 9, 1862; launched on October 27, 1862; and commissioned on February 9, 1863 at Chester, Pennsylvania, Commodore Pierce Crosby in command.

Assigned to the North Atlantic blockade
The monitor was assigned to the North Atlantic Blockading Squadron and soon began efficient but unspectacular operations in Hampton Roads, Virginia and in the many roughly parallel rivers which empty into Chesapeake Bay. Sangamon was one of the vital ships of the Navy which guaranteed the Army control of the waters which border and penetrate the bitterly contested land which separated Washington, D.C. and Richmond, Virginia.

After Union blockade duty off Charleston, South Carolina, she returned to Hampton Roads in the summer to support General Ulysses S. Grant's drive on Richmond, Virginia.

Varied river duties
Sangamon performed widely varied duties. She conducted reconnaissance expeditions up the river to obtain information, and often dueled Confederate forces hidden along the banks. She guarded Union troop concentrations and served as part of the Union naval force which patrolled the upper James to prevent the Confederate flotilla from threatening Union transports.

In March–April 1865, during the final thrust on Richmond, Virginia, she assisted in clearing the river of Confederate torpedoes (mines) and countering the threat of Confederate ironclads so that Union shipping could proceed safely to the Confederate capital. One of her final wartime assignments Sangamon was required to perform, was to accompany the tugboat flotilla towing the previously captured and unfinished Confederate casemate ironclad  to her final destination at the Norfolk Naval Shipyard on May 3, 1865. The overall expedition was led by Sangamons skipper at the time, Lieutenant Commander R. Chandler.

Post–Civil War operations
After the war ended, Sangamon was decommissioned at Philadelphia and placed in reserve. Renamed Jason on 10 June 1869, no record has been found of any subsequent active service until she was recommissioned on 13 May 1898 for service during the Spanish–American War. The old monitor was stationed at Fisher's Island, Long Island, New York where she provided the New York City area with some degree of naval protection against the perceived threat of a raid by Spanish cruisers.

Final decommissioning
In 1899, she returned to Philadelphia and was placed in reserve at League Island, where she remained until sold in April 1904.

Sources
 This article contains text from the US Naval Historical Center.
 
 Additional technical data from

References

External links

 navsource.org: USS Sangamon
 hazegray.org: USS Sangamon

 

Passaic-class monitors
1862 ships
Ships built by Reaney, Son & Archbold
Ships of the Union Navy
American Civil War monitors of the United States
American Civil War patrol vessels of the United States
Spanish–American War monitors of the United States